904L is an austenitic stainless steel. Though notably softer than 316L, its molybdenum addition gives it superior resistance to localized attack (pitting and crevice corrosion) by chlorides and greater resistance reducing acids and in particular its copper addition gives it useful corrosion resistance to all concentrations of sulphuric acid. Its high alloying content also gives it greater resistance to chloride stress corrosion cracking, but it is still susceptible. Its low carbon content makes it resistant to sensitization by welding and which prevents intergranular corrosion.

It has applications in piping systems, pollution control equipment, heat exchangers, and bleaching systems.

Omega SA experimented with 904L or 'Uranus Steel' with the PloProf dive watches in 1971-72. The inspiration came from French deep sea diving company COMEX, who used this steel in their diving bells due to superior corrosion resistance in salt water.

In 1985 Rolex began to utilize 904L grade steel in its watches.  Rolex chose to use this variety of steel because it takes a higher polish than other grades of steel and provides greater corrosion resistance.

Composition 

 Nickel, 23–28%
 Chromium, 19–23%
 Carbon, 0.02% maximum
 Copper, 1–2%
 Molybdenum, 4–5%
 Manganese, 2% maximum
 Silicon, 1.0% maximum
 Iron, (balance)

Other names 
UNS N08904
EN 1.4539
SUS 904L
SS2562

See also
SAF 2205

References

Stainless steel